Alan MacGregor Cranston (June 19, 1914 – December 31, 2000) was an American politician and journalist who served as a United States Senator from California from 1969 to 1993, and as a President of the World Federalist Association from 1949 to 1952.

Born in Palo Alto, California, Cranston worked as a journalist after graduating from Stanford University. After serving as California State Controller, he was elected to the Senate in 1968. He served as the Senate Democratic Whip from 1977 to 1991. In 1984, Cranston sought the Democratic presidential nomination, advocating a nuclear freeze during the later stages of the Cold War. He dropped out after the first set of primaries.

In 1991, the Senate Ethics Committee reprimanded Cranston for his role in the savings and loan crisis as a member of the Keating Five. After being diagnosed with prostate cancer, he decided not to run for a fifth term. After his retirement from the Senate, he served as president of the Global Security Institute and advocated for the global abolition of nuclear weapons.

Early life and education
Cranston was born in Palo Alto, California, the son of Carol (née Dixon) and William MacGregor Cranston. He attended Pomona College for one year and studied abroad for a summer at the National Autonomous University of Mexico before graduating from Stanford University in 1936 with a degree in English.

Early career

Cranston was a correspondent for the International News Service for two years before World War II. When an abridged English-language translation of Adolf Hitler's Mein Kampf was released, sanitized to exclude some of Hitler's anti-Semitism and militancy, Cranston published a different translation (with annotations) that he believed reflected the contents of the book more accurately. In 1939, Hitler's publisher sued him for copyright violation in Connecticut; a judge ruled in Hitler's favor and publication of the book was halted, but by then a half million copies had been sold, helping inform a wide audience about the threat Hitler posed.

Before enlisting in the armed forces in 1944, Cranston worked as an editor and writer for the magazine Common Ground, and later in the Office of War Information. Enlisting in the army as a private in 1944, he requested service with a combat unit after completing Infantry basic training, but was instead assigned to be editor of Army Talk magazine. While on active duty, he wrote a second book, The Killing of the Peace, a synopsis of the failed bid to get the United States to join the League of Nations immediately after World War I. Cranston held the rank of sergeant when he was discharged at the end of the war in 1945.

A supporter of world government, Cranston attended the 1945 conference that led to the Dublin Declaration and became president of the World Federalist Association in 1948. He successfully pushed the California legislature to pass the 1949 World Federalist California Resolution, calling on Congress to amend the Constitution to allow U.S. participation in a federal world government. Also in the late 1940s, Cranston began his longstanding opposition to nuclear weapons.

In 1952, Cranston co-founded the California Democratic Council (CDC), and served as chairman. Since that time, the CDC has served as an unofficial coalition of local Democratic clubs that coordinate electoral activities and activism throughout California. The CDC provided substantial support to Cranston in his bid for State Controller in 1958 and his numerous runs for the U.S. Senate.

Public office

State Controller
A Democrat, Cranston was elected California State Controller in 1958, reelected in 1962, and defeated for reelection in 1966.

U.S. Senator
In 1968, Cranston was elected to the first of four terms in the United States Senate, defeating Republican Max Rafferty in the general election after the staunchly conservative Rafferty had defeated the liberal Republican incumbent, Thomas Kuchel, in that party's primary.

The election was marred by mudslinging. A conservative writer, Frank Capell, authored a pamphlet suggesting that Cranston might have had Communist leanings in his youth, and that during his stint at the Office of War Information he helped falsely convince Franklin D. Roosevelt that Nazi Germany had perpetrated the Katyń massacre. Many of the same allegations were recycled in an article that ran in American Opinion in 1974 titled "Alan Cranston: The Shadow in the Senate". (The article's title was a reference to Lamont Cranston, the main character in the popular radio program The Shadow.)

During his first few months in office, Cranston introduced a resolution calling for President Nixon to halt closing 59 Job Corps Centers. He amended the original resolution to include a June 30 deadline that would allow Congress to do a study of the targeted facilities and removed language criticizing the Nixon administration for damaging trainees' lives by closing the facilities. In April 1969, the Senate Labor and Public Welfare Committee approved the revised Cranston proposal in a vote of 10 to 6. Cranston predicted victory for the resolution when it was taken up for a vote by the entire chamber, but the Senate defeated it on May 13, 1969, by a vote of 52 to 40.

In a September 12, 1971 statement, Cranston disputed the Pentagon's claims that military manpower and national security would be threatened if Congress did not renew Nixon's draft authority and said he would filibuster the draft measure.

In September 1973, Cranston introduced an amendment that would reduce American forces overseas by 20% in the next 18 months and would include naval forces. It was introduced as a fallback amendment to the 40% reduction in American forces overseas Senator Mike Mansfield had offered.

In November 1973, Cranston announced his support for the nomination of Gerald Ford as vice president. He said his support came after consulting "several hundred persons—Democrats and Republicans, business and labor leaders, elected politicians and party functionaries—in his own state of California" and finding little opposition to Ford.

On April 23, 1974, Cranston stated that members of the Veterans Administration had been encouraged to contribute to Nixon's reelection campaign and that head of the Veterans Administration Donald E. Johnson was privy to these activities. Cranston's allegations were corroborated later that day by a former VA employee.

In 1974, Cranston defeated Republican H.L. "Bill" Richardson, a conservative state senator previously affiliated with the John Birch Society. Cranston polled 3,693,160 votes (60.5%) to Richardson's 2,210,267 (36.2%).

In 1979, after 19 senators signed a letter indicating that their support for the SALT II treaty hinged on President Jimmy Carter's response to its impact on U.S. defense posture, Cranston said their concerns were legitimate but mostly did not "relate directly to the text of the SALT II treaty" and it was likely that their reservations about the treaty could be resolved without using killer amendments.

In 1980, Cranston defeated Republican Paul Gann, 4,705,399 (56.5%) to 3,093,426 (37.1%). His campaign was notable for a July 31 benefit that was the last concert The Eagles played at together for 14 years. During the event Cranston's wife thanked Eagles guitarist Don Felder for performing, to which Felder reportedly replied, "You're welcome...I guess." Bandmate Glenn Frey took exception to Felder's comment, leading to onstage bickering and the band's breakup immediately after the concert.

In March 1981, Cranston was one of 24 elected officials to issue a joint statement calling on the Reagan administration to find a peaceful solution to the Ulster conflict.

In April 1981, during a Senate floor speech, Cranston asserted that India and Pakistan had entered the final stages of their preparation for nuclear test sites, speculating that India "will decide to make another test at the Pokaran site in the next few months" and Pakistan "could produce the fissile materials for a similar test, perhaps by the end of this year, most likely by the end of 1982." He did not identify the source of his information, but senior Reagan administration officials verified "the gist of Senator Cranston's information."

The New York Times called Cranston a "bald, craggy-looking, none-too-charismatic man."

Cranston was reelected in 1986, defeating Republican nominee Congressman Ed Zschau.

On October 2, 1990, Cranston was one of nine senators to vote against the nomination of David Souter for Associate Justice of the Supreme Court.

Presidential candidate

Cranston was Democratic Whip from 1977 to 1991.

He was an unsuccessful candidate for the Democratic presidential nomination for the 1984 election. He became the first announced candidate on February 1, 1983. Despite his age (69) and appearance that seemed even older (he dyed his little remaining white hair a color that most called orange), Cranston quickly became a recognized candidate. His strong support for a nuclear freeze won him an intense following among anti-nuclear activists, support that translated into campaign donations, committed staff (future Washington Senator Maria Cantwell moved to the state in 1983 to head up Cranston's caucus campaign effort there) and volunteers and straw poll victories in Wisconsin, California, and Alabama. However, the entry of George McGovern into the race in September 1983 cut into Cranston's support. He finished a weak fourth in Iowa in February 1984 and dropped out a week later after finishing seventh out of eight candidates in New Hampshire, with only 2 percent of the vote.

Cranston also faced a campaign debt of $2 million from his 1984 run as he began gearing up for an expensive and tough re-election fight in 1986, when he narrowly defeated the liberal Republican U.S. Representative Ed Zschau, who later left the Republican Party.

Reprimand
On November 20, 1991, Cranston was reprimanded by the U.S. Senate Select Committee on Ethics for "improper conduct" after Lincoln Savings head Charles Keating's companies contributed $850,000 to voter registration groups closely affiliated with Cranston. Keating had wanted federal regulators to stop "hounding" his savings and loan association. Although the committee found that "no evidence was presented to the Committee that Senator Cranston ever agreed to help Mr. Keating in return for a contribution", the committee deemed Cranston's misconduct the worst among the Keating Five. Cranston decided against running for a fifth term while he battled prostate cancer. He was succeeded as California's senior senator by Barbara Boxer.

Track and field
Throughout his public life, Cranston was notable for practicing and participating in the sport of track and field as a sprinter in special senior races. Many of the events, races for senior sprinters at major track meets, were the early events that became the sport of masters athletics. While on his many political trips, Cranston would spend time sprinting in long hotel hallways to maintain his fitness.

Personal life 
Cranston's family was wealthy, with investments in real estate. He married and divorced twice. His first wife, Geneva McMath, was the mother of his sons, Robin, who died young in an auto accident, and Kim, who survived him. Cranston later married Norma Weintraub.

Retirement and death
He dedicated his retirement to the global abolition of nuclear weapons, first through the Nuclear Weapon Elimination Initiative of the State of the World Forum, and then as President of the Global Security Institute, which he founded in 1999.

He lived in Los Altos, California, from his retirement until his death on December 31, 2000.

See also

Global Security Institute

References

External links
Finding Aid to the Alan Cranston Papers, 1914–1993, bulk 1940–1993, The Bancroft Library

|-

|-

|-

|-

|-

|-

|-

|-

|-

1914 births
2000 deaths
20th-century American politicians
American male journalists
Journalists from California
United States Army personnel of World War II
California Democrats
Censured or reprimanded United States senators
Democratic Party United States senators from California
American masters athletes
National Autonomous University of Mexico alumni
People from the San Francisco Bay Area
People from Los Altos, California
Pomona College alumni
Stanford University alumni
State Controllers of California
Candidates in the 1984 United States presidential election
World federalist activists
20th-century American male writers
20th-century American non-fiction writers
People of the United States Office of War Information
United States Army soldiers
20th-century American journalists